John Lawrence O'Brien (November 22, 1911 – April 22, 2007) was an American accountant and politician in the state of Washington. He served in the Washington House of Representatives from 1939 to 1947 and from 1949 to 1993.

References

2007 deaths
1911 births
American accountants
Democratic Party members of the Washington House of Representatives
20th-century American politicians